Gonsé is a village in the Kongoussi Department of Bam Province in northern Burkina Faso. It had a population of 56 in 1996.

References

Populated places in the Centre-Nord Region
Bam Province